Callum Jones may refer to:

Callum Jones (footballer, born 2001), Welsh football midfielder
Callum Jones (footballer, born 2002), Welsh football defender
Callum Rebecchi, also known as Callum Jones, fictional character from Australian soap opera Neighbours